Marlon Iván "El Chino" León y León (born 3 March 1967) is a Guatemalan football manager and retired  football defender who has played over 10 years for Guatemala's national team.

He most recently managed Heredia in the 2010 Clausura.

Club career
León has played the majority of his career for CSD Comunicaciones, one of Guatemala's most successful football clubs. He has also played for Deportivo Escuintla, Cobán Imperial and army side Aurora.

International career
He made his debut for Guatemala in a February 1989 friendly match against Poland and has earned a total of 34 caps, scoring no goals. He has represented his country in 4 FIFA World Cup qualification matches and played at several UNCAF Cups as well as at the 1998, 2000 and 2003 CONCACAF Gold Cups.

His final international was a March 1999 US Cup match against the United States.

Managerial career
León started his coaching career at second division side Deportivo Nueva Concepción and managed Heredia, the Guatemalan U-21 side, Comunicaciones, Xinabajul whom he led to the premier division, Malacateco and Zacapa. In February 2010, he rejoined Heredia.

References

External links
 Profile - La Figura 

1967 births
Living people
Sportspeople from Guatemala City
Guatemalan people of Chinese descent
Sportspeople of Chinese descent
Guatemalan footballers
Guatemala international footballers
1991 CONCACAF Gold Cup players
1996 CONCACAF Gold Cup players
1998 CONCACAF Gold Cup players
Comunicaciones F.C. players
Aurora F.C. players
Guatemalan football managers
Association football defenders